David E Miller Hill is a summit in Weber County, Utah, United States with an elevation of . It is located near the southeast edge of Fremont Island in the Great Salt Lake.

David E Miller Hill was named for David E. Miller, a state geography official.

References

External links

Mountains of Weber County, Utah
Mountains of Utah